Q74 may refer to:
 Q74 (New York City bus)
 Al-Muddaththir, a surah of the Quran